Moli Lesesa (born 1 April 1984) is a Mosotho footballer who currently plays as a midfielder for Joy FC. Since 2008, he has won 13 caps and scored one goal for the Lesotho national football team.

External links
 

Association football midfielders
Lesotho footballers
Lesotho international footballers
1984 births
Living people